Richard Guy Fugler is a former professional American football player who played offensive lineman for two seasons for the Chicago Cardinals and Pittsburgh Steelers.

References

1931 births
American football offensive linemen
Chicago Cardinals players
Pittsburgh Steelers players
Tulane Green Wave football players
Living people